Oh, Lady Be Good is an acoustic trio jazz album with Michele Ramo as leader, released July 19, 2005. The album features the renowned Bucky Pizzarelli on guitar.

Track listing

 "Oh, Lady Be Good"
 "Autumn Nocturne"
 "Crazy Rhythm"
 "Everything I Have is Yours"
 "Have You Met Miss Jones"
 "They Can’t Take That Away From Me"
 "Nuages"
 "Stardust"
 "Tears"
 "Nuages"
 "Mélodie au Crépuscule"
 "A Time For Love"

Personnel

Michele Ramo - violin
Bucky Pizzarelli - guitar
Jerry Bruno - double bass

2005 albums
Bucky Pizzarelli albums
Swing albums